A Spoonful of Sherman is a musical revue written and emceed by Robert J. Sherman which premiered on January 6, 2014 at the St. James Theatre in London. 

A Spoonful of Sherman first served as the UK book launch for Sherman's father's (posthumously released) autobiography: Moose: Chapters From My Life for which Sherman was also the book's editor.  After each performance of that original run, Sherman participated in a book signing after the show. The show was billed as "A Celebration of the Life, Times and Songs of Robert B. Sherman" and was received extremely well by the crowd and the critics alike.  

The show's name is derived from the title of the popular song "A Spoonful of Sugar" from the successful 1964 Walt Disney musical motion picture, Mary Poppins. The song was written by the Sherman Brothers.

The cast consisted of four rising West End theatre stars including Charlotte Wakefield, Emma Williams, Stuart Matthew Price and Greg Castiglioni.  Musical Direction was provided by Colin Billing and the show was directed by Stewart Nicholls. Lighting was designed by the show's Stage Manager Andrew Holton. In the 2017 version of the show, focus of the show's narrative shifted to both Sherman Brothers' lives as well as to the life of their father, Al Sherman.

Premise 
The show covers ninety years of Sherman songwriting (including material written by the Sherman Brothers' father, Al Sherman (who began writing music in the early 1920s). Songs written by the younger Robert Sherman were also included in the show as well) but the focus of the evening was the music and lyrics of Robert B. Sherman and the Sherman Brothers.

Productions

2014 Productions
The show was originally produced by MusicWorld (UK) in association with the St. James Theatre, James Albrecht, Creative Director. Joanne Benjamin and Clive Chenery of The Entertainment Business provided General Management. 

The show was successful enough to merit further shows be scheduled for April 2014.

2017 Production
A Spoonful of Sherman returned to London from August 7–20, 2017 at "Live at Zédel". Helena Blackman and Daniel Boys starred alongside pianist/singer Christopher Hamilton. Narrating the show once again was Robert J. Sherman. While the book for the two 2014 productions largely remained the same, in the 2017 version, Sherman modified his script, removing emphasis on his father, Robert B. Sherman's life and making the story more about both Sherman Brothers (Robert and Richard) and their Tin Pan Alley era songwriter father, Al Sherman.  New musical arrangements were provided by Rowland Lee.  Robert J. Sherman explained that changes had to do with the evolution of the show's purpose for being.  In 2014 the show was designed merely to serve as a "happy memorial" to his recently deceased songwriter father, Robert B. Sherman, but as the show grew, it began to take on a life of its own, the purpose, and therefore, the focus of the show needed to change as well.

2018 UK/Ireland Tour
On December 20, 2017, producers James Yeoburn of United Theatrical and Robert J. Sherman announced the launch of the first A Spoonful of Sherman UK/Ireland tour.  The tour premiered on February 14, 2018 at the EM Forester Theatre in Tonbridge, Kent with its press night held on March 27 in Greenwich. The tour production was a radical departure from the previous three incarnations of the show.  The evolution was described as a morphing from a clever cabaret to a fully realized stage musical.  Cast members for the tour include Sophie-Louise Dann, Mark Read, Glen Facey, Jenna Innes and Ben Stock. Directing and choreographing is Stewart Nicholls.  A new book was devised by Robert Sherman. Stage and costume design was by Gabriella Slade, Lighting Design was by Chris Withers and new musical arrangements and musical supervision is by Rowland Lee.  The tour played in 25 different cities, in as many venues.  Tour dates included: Pavilion Theatre (Bournemouth); Theatre Royal (St. Helens); Tivoli Theatre (Aberdeen); Eden Court (Inverness); Hippodrome (Darlington); Chequer Mead (East Grinstead); Yvonne Arnaud Theatre (Guildford); Theatre Royal (Windsor); Greenwich Theatre (London) Buxton Opera House (Buxton); Swansea Grand Theatre (Swansea);  Harrogate Theatre (Harrogate);  Atkinson Theatre (Southport); Queens Theatre (Hornchurch); 
Shanklin Theatre (Isle of Wight); Riverfront Center Theatre, (Newport); Octagon Theatre (Yeovil); Wyvern Theatre (Swindon); Theatre Royal (Lincoln); Playhouse Theatre (Weston-super-Mare); Northcott Theatre (Exeter); Queens Theatre, (Barnstaple); Theatre Royal, (Dumfries); Beacon Arts Centre, (Greenock); Everyman Theatre (Cork) and Pavilion Theatre (Dublin).

2019 Licensed Productions
In late 2018 the previous year's UK/Ireland tour version was made available for professional license. In April 2019 A Spoonful of Sherman made its U.S. premiere in San Jose, California.  The San Jose run played for five weeks at the 3Below Stages featuring veteran Bay Area performers, Shannon Guggenheim, Stephen Guggenheim, Susan Gundunas, F. James Raasch, Teresa Swain and pianist Barry Koron.  In July 2019 it was announced that a licensed production of A Spoonful of Sherman would be presented by Sing'Theatre at School of the Arts in Singapore starring Hossan Leong, Mina Ellen Kaye, George Chan, Aaron Khaled and Vanessa Kee.

Critical praise for A Spoonful of Sherman
  Pete Shaw of Broadway Baby gave the show 5 stars ★ ★ ★ ★ ★ writing: "There’s a light bulb moment in A Spoonful Of Sherman when you realise its magic lies not within its high production values, exquisite lighting, fantastic set, immaculate choreography or supremely talented cast, but with the memories these songs ignite...Ultimately, A Spoonful Of Sherman is a feel-good musical journey executed with polished flair."
  Clive Davis of The London Times gave the show 4 Stars ★ ★ ★ ★, writing that it was: “A show that strings together one joyous hit after another, delivered by a first-rate quartet of singers.”
 Mark Shenton of The Stage wrote, "There’s plenty to both surprise and delight here."
  UK Theatre Web gave the show 5 Stars ★ ★ ★ ★ ★ writing: “It really was supercalifragilisticexpialidocious. Riffs and mash-ups on Winnie The Pooh, Chitty Chitty Bang Bang, Mary Poppins and a smashing Al Sherman Medley made the evening all too short, all too few songs, all the more memorable. I feel privileged to have been there. A truly scrumptious smorgasbord of smash hits by the Sherman Brothers.”
  North West End gave the show 5 stars ★ ★ ★ ★ ★ writing: "The Sherman Brothers might have said that a song must be Singable, Sellable and Sincere. But, A Spoonful Of Sherman is Stylist, Slick and Superbly Sang throughout."
  Bargaintheatreland gave the show 5 stars ★ ★ ★ ★ ★ writing: "Something magical happened at St James Theatre – it was a night of revelation, emotion and sheer joy."
  Jonathan Baz gave the show 4 Stars ★ ★ ★ ★ in 2014 writing: “It is a wonder that this charming show has not been staged before. Amidst all of Broadway’s giant songwriting partnerships, none reaches out to the child within us quite like the legacy of the Sherman Brothers. Cleverly crafted songs that speak of hope against adversity, written in verses that talk to every age. This show deserves to tour and when it comes to your town, don’t miss it!”  In 2017 Baz reviewed the show again, and once again gave the show 4 Stars ★ ★ ★ ★ writing: "...but for all the family’s multi-generational talent, this show lives and breathes the genius of the Sherman Brothers. Love, laughter and history – it’s all here in a charming evening’s entertainment."
  Rhiannon Lawson of What's On Stage gave the show 4 Stars ★ ★ ★ ★ and wrote: "If you love a bit of nostaligia, enjoy flying a kite, singing with orangutans, feeding the birds or wondered what the wonderful thing about Tiggers is, you will have a Truly Scrumptious evening at A Spoonful of Sherman. Leaving the theatre with a spring in my step, I don't expect my sugar rush from this evening to be over for some time.
 Phil Willmott of London Box Office gave the 2017 Zedel production 5 Stars ★ ★ ★ ★ ★ commenting: "Sherman himself has a charming and unassuming stage persona and when he's joined by the glossily accomplished trio of Helena Blackman, Daniel Boys, and singer/accompanist Christopher Hamilton the four have an enjoyably quirky chemistry on stage. Helena Blackman has a soaring gorgeous voice and is adept at conveying every nuance of a lyric. Aspiring musical theatre performers really should study her technique and Daniel Boys combines a rich and sumptuous vocal range with a delightful playfulness." 
 Edward Seckerson wrote: “A cavalcade of Sherman, three generations, no medicine, just charm, and one or two genuine surprises...to demonstrate that the legacy lives on – “Music of the Spheres” by Robert J. Sherman (given a real sheen by Stuart Matthew Price). I want to hear that again, as I do “The Whistle Tune” from Busker Alley.”
  Traffic Light Theatregoer wrote "Robert J. [Sherman]'s more recent works such as "Music Of The Spheres"...made A Spoonful Of Sherman a full-bodied experience for us. Helena Blackman soaring soprano easily encompassed a range of 20th century song styles from perky 1920s to near operetta to the limpid notes and musical hall idiom of Sherman Brothers' songs. Meanwhile Daniel Boys put his own Eastenders stamp on chimney sweep Bert's songs from Mary Poppins and the doowop jazzy Jungle Book numbers" 

  Remotegoat gave the show 5 stars ★ ★ ★ ★ ★ writing that it was: "Supercalifragilistic-expialidocious! An evening of magic and delight."
  Musical Theatre Review wrote: "I predict a great future for A Spoonful of Sherman. Don’t miss this great cast!"
  West End Wilma gave the show 5 stars ★ ★ ★ ★ ★ writing: "The audience were on the edge of their seats yearning for more."
  The Public Reviews called the show: "Irresistible" giving it 4 stars ★ ★ ★ ★  “A delightful way to spend a couple of hours - great fun."
  The Leighton Buzzard Observer wrote: “Walt Disney may have built a magical ‘toon empire but it was the Sherman Brothers who gave the mouse maestro his voice. A Spoonful of Sherman is a night of pure indulgence.”
  Stagey Secrets wrote: “Truly scrumptious. The overwhelming power of their music is inescapable.”

Original London Cast Recording

The double CD, Original London Cast Recording was recorded between July 2014 and February 2015. It was produced by Nicholas Lloyd Webber and mixed and engineered by Matthew Weir at the Palace Studios, located in London. Mastering was produced by Simon Grieff and engineered by Sam Featherstone at Price Recording. The executive producer of the album was Robert Sherman. It was released by SimG Records on July 13, 2015. The cast recording was released digitally on iTunes September 7, 2015.

References

External links
 A Spoonful Of Sherman Official Website
 A Spoonful Of Sherman UK/Ireland Tour (2018 Promotional Video)
 A Spoonful Of Sherman at West End Live 2018
 Emma Williams sings "Mother Earth and Father Time" from the Original London Cast Recording
 A Spoonful of Sherman at Live At Zedel - 2017 Preview Video
 Dress Circle Of London

2014 musicals
Cabaret in Europe
Musicals by Robert J. Sherman
Revues
Sherman Brothers
West End musicals